Journal of Experimental Biology (formerly The British Journal of Experimental Biology) is a peer-reviewed scientific journal in the field of comparative physiology and integrative biology. It is published by The Company of Biologists. The journal is partnered with Publons and has two-way integration with bioRxiv. Journal of Experimental Biology is now a hybrid journal and publishes 24 issues a year. Content over six months old is free to read.

History 
The British Journal of Experimental Biology was established in Edinburgh in 1923 (Br. J. Exp. Biol.). It was published by Oliver and Boyd and edited by F. A. E. Crew with an Editorial Board of nine members, including Julian Huxley. When the journal ran into financial trouble, George Parker Bidder II, the founder of The Company of Biologists, rescued it in 1925. Sir James Gray was appointed as the journal's first Editor-in-Chief in 1925 and the journal was renamed The Journal of Experimental Biology in 1929.

The journal has published ground-breaking work in the areas of biomechanics, skin transplantation and neurophysiology, and has published work by Nobel Prize winners Peter Medawar and August Krogh.

Journal content from 1923 is available online via the journal website. Content over six months old is freely available, and authors may choose to make their article Open Access by paying a subsidised fee. All journal content is freely available to community members in developing countries through the Health InterNetwork Access to Research Initiative. 

In 2009, Journal of Experimental Biology was included in the School Library Association's top 100 journals in Biology and Medicine over the last 100 years.

Scope and content 
Journal of Experimental Biology publishes original research articles, methods and techniques, and reviews in the field of comparative physiology. 

The journal currently publishes papers on a wide range of subjects from biomechanics and metabolic physiology, to neurophysiology and neuroethology. Besides peer-reviewed research, the journal features additional material such as “Inside JEB”, which provides information about some of each issue’s content, “Outside JEB”, which discusses literature published in other journals, “JEB Classics”, which revisit key papers published in the journal’s history, and “Commentaries”, which review topics of current interest.

The journal operates on a continuous publication model. The final version of record is released online as soon as it is ready.

Abstracting and indexing 
Journal of Experimental Biology is abstracted and/or indexed by:

 BIOBASE
 CAB abstracts
 Cambridge Scientific Abstracts
 Current Contents
 EMBASE
 Web of Science
 Medline
 Scopus

Journal of Experimental Biology is a signatory of the San Francisco Declaration on Research Assessment (DORA).

Journal management 
Since the journal's establishment in 1923, there have been seven Editors-in-Chief:

 1926-1955: Sir James Gray
 1952-1974: J. A. Ramsay
 1955-1974: Sir Vincent Wigglesworth
 1974-1989: John Treherne
 1989-1994: Charlie Ellington
 1994-2003: Bob Boutilier
 2004-2020: Hans Hoppeler (University of Bern, Switzerland)
 2020 onwards: Craig Franklin (University of Queensland, Australia)

References

External links 
 
 The Company of Biologists website

Biology journals
Delayed open access journals
Publications established in 1923
The Company of Biologists academic journals